Javorek may refer to:

Places
 Javorek, Czech Republic, a village near Žďár nad Sázavou
 Javorek, Croatia, a village near Samobor

Other uses
 Javorek (surname)